The Dasmariñas–Las Piñas Transmission Line (abbreviated as 8LI1DAS-LPI and 8LI2DAS-LPI) is a 230,000 volt, double-circuit transmission line in Metro Manila and Calabarzon, Philippines that connects Dasmariñas and Las Piñas substations of National Grid Corporation of the Philippines (NGCP).

History
The Dasmariñas–Las Piñas Transmission Line went into service on November 30, 2001. It is operated and maintained by the privately-owned National Grid Corporation of the Philippines (NGCP) since January 15, 2009, and previously by government-owned companies National Transmission Corporation (TransCo) and National Power Corporation (NAPOCOR). It was owned previously by NAPOCOR from November 30, 2001 to March 1, 2003 and is owned currently by TransCo since March 1, 2003.

Throughout its existence, several steel poles were painted with aluminum paint to protect them from corrosion.

Route description

The Dasmariñas–Las Piñas Transmission Line passes through the cities of Dasmariñas, Imus, and Bacoor in Cavite, and Las Piñas in Metro Manila. It is located within the service area of NGCP's South Luzon Operations and Maintenance (SLOM) District 1 (South Western Tagalog).

The transmission line starts at Dasmariñas substation, turns left into Ramon Tirona Avenue, and run parallel with Aguinaldo Highway until Bacoor. Upon approaching Bacoor Junction, it will parallel with Aguinaldo Boulevard until Bacoor Exit of Manila-Cavite Expressway (CAVITEX). It then utilize the eastern side of CAVITEX until its terminus at Las Piñas substation.

Technical description
The transmission line consists of 209 steel poles (1–209) and 1 lattice tower (208A) totaling to 210 transmission structures, with lattice tower 208A was built by NGCP on a location where a water tower was once located in 2016. It is a quadruple-bundle and double-circuit transmission line, with six insulators are placed on each pole (except pole 208 since 2016 where three of its insulators were removed due to the construction of tower 208A thus the insulators for pole 208 and tower 208A are now separated). Three insulators carry a single power line circuit (line 1), while another three carries another circuit (line 2).

Notes

References

Energy infrastructure completed in 2001
Transmission lines in the Philippines